Tontelea is a genus of plants in the family Celastraceae.

Species
Species accepted by the Plants of the World Online as of January 2023:

Tontelea attenuata 
Tontelea congestiflora 
Tontelea corcovadensis 
Tontelea coriacea 
Tontelea corymbosa 
Tontelea cylindrocarpa 
Tontelea emarginata 
Tontelea fuliginea 
Tontelea hondurensis 
Tontelea lanceolata 
Tontelea laxiflora 
Tontelea leptophylla 
Tontelea martiana 
Tontelea mauritioides 
Tontelea micrantha 
Tontelea miersii 
Tontelea passiflora 
Tontelea sandwithii 
Tontelea tenuicula

References

 
Celastrales genera
Taxonomy articles created by Polbot